Those Were the Days – The Best Of Leningrad Cowboys is a two-disc greatest hits album packaged in a DVD style case in a box set with a deck of playing cards. It was distributed only at ABC, a Finnish chain of service stations.

Track listing

Sources

Leningrad Cowboys albums
2009 greatest hits albums